House of Blue Fire is a Big Finish Productions audio drama based on the long-running British science fiction television series Doctor Who. It contains a four-part story.

Plot
The Master of Bluefire House welcomes his guests:
No 18 – athazagoraphobia (the fear of being forgotten or ignored)
No 5 – aquaphobia (the fear of water)
No 16 – blattodephobia (fear of cockroaches)
No 12 – catoptrophobia (the fear of mirrors or reflections)

Cast
The Doctor – Sylvester McCoy
Dr Magnus Soames – Timothy West
No 18 (Sally Morgan) – Amy Pemberton
No 5 – Miranda Keeling
No 16 – Ray Emmet Brown
No 12 – Howard Gossington
Eve Pritchard / Mi’en Kalarash – Lizzy Watts

Continuity
Sally Morgan and the Doctor's black TARDIS return in Project: Nirvana and Black and White.
Black and White features a scene taking place just before House of Blue Fire, in which the Doctor is arriving, having just left Celdor in The Doomsday Quatrain.  It also features scenes directly after House of Blue Fire.

External links
House of Blue Fire

2011 audio plays
Seventh Doctor audio plays
Fiction set in 2020